Trovo (Lombard: Tröv) is a comune (municipality) in the Province of Pavia in the Italian region of Lombardy, about  southwest of Milan and  northwest of Pavia.

Trovo borders the following municipalities: Battuda, Bereguardo, Casorate Primo, Motta Visconti, Rognano, Trivolzio, Vernate.

References

Cities and towns in Lombardy